Spomen Ploča (officially known as Spomen Ploča 2002-2009) is a "Best Of" album of Bosnian rapper Edo Maajka - it was released in June 2010.

The contains 3 songs from each of his previous four albums and 2 never released songs (Fotelja and Tata Mama) from songs from what was supposed to be his Trnokop album.

Track listing

References

2010 albums
Edo Maajka albums